Stolbovo is a rural locality (a selo) and the administrative center of Stolbovsky Selsoviet, Kamensky District, Altai Krai, Russia. The population was 841 in 2013. There are eight streets.

Geography 
Stolbovo is located 24 km northeast of Kamen-na-Obi (the district's administrative centre) by road. Klyuchi is the nearest rural locality.

References 

Rural localities in Kamensky District, Altai Krai